Saugandh is a 1991 Indian Hindi-language romantic action film directed by Raj N. Sippy. It stars Akshay Kumar in his film debut (as a leading actor), alongside and Shantipriya (in her Hindi debut).

Plot
Sarang Singh is a proud, arrogant and powerful landlord, who refuses to let people garland him as he believes that a man should never bow his head. He adores his little sister Chand and she falls in love with Shiva. Shiva is from an agricultural background family and has a loving family—father, mother, sister, brother and most importantly, his sister-in-law Ganga, who adores him. Sarang learns of the romance and kills Shiva, Chand and everyone in Shiva's family. However, Ganga, who was pregnant at the time, had just fainted. She makes an oath /saugandh that she will make Sarang bow his head. She challenges Sarang that she will have a son and Sarang will have a daughter and that her son will become Sarang's son-in-law and will make him bow his head. Sarang accepts the challenge and declares that he will kill her son when that day comes. Her son is named Shiva Kirplani and Sarang names his daughter Chand (Shanti Priya). Chand is brought up as a ruthless guy rather than a girl. Shiva and Chand meet. Chand hates Shiva initially and they fall in love soon enough. Ranbir Singh also wants to marry Chand to punish her for insulting him rest of the story forms the plot.

Cast
 Raakhee as Ganga Kirplani
 Akshay Kumar as Shiva Kirplani
 Shantipriya as Chand
 Pankaj Dheer as Ranveer Singh
 Mukesh Khanna as Chaudhary Sarang
 Mayur Verma as Shiva 
 Amita Nangia as Chand 
 Roopa Ganguly as Rajhaa
 Aryeman Ramsay as young Shiva
 Beena Banerjee as Shanti
 Paintal as Bajrangi
 Arun Bali as Hari Singh

Soundtrack
Sameer wrote all songs except "Mitwa Mere Saath Main Tere" which was penned by Anand Bakshi.

References

External links
 

1991 films
1990s Hindi-language films
Films scored by Anand–Milind
Hindi films remade in other languages
Films directed by Raj N. Sippy
Indian romantic action films